The 1997 FIVB Volleyball Men's U21 World Championship was the 9th edition of the FIVB Volleyball Men's U21 World Championship. It was held in Manama, Bahrain from August 22 to 31, 1997.

Poland won their first title in the tournament by defeating Brazil.

Final round

5th–8th semifinals

|}

7th place

|}

5th place

|}

Quarterfinals

|}

Semifinals

|}

3rd place

|}

Final

|}

Final standing

References

External links
 FIVB

FIVB Volleyball Men's U21 World Championship
1997 in volleyball
International volleyball competitions hosted by Bahrain
1997 in youth sport